Ejaz Qaiser (1952 – 26 May 2020) was a Pakistani singer. He was known for singing Ghazals. On 14 August 2015, President of Pakistan bestowed him with Pride of Performance.

Death 
He was suffering from multiple diseases. On 25 May 2020, he was hospitalized in Faisalabad. He died on 26 May 2020, at the age of 68. His funeral was held in Faisalabad.

References

1952 births
2020 deaths
Pakistani ghazal singers
Male ghazal singers
Recipients of the Pride of Performance
20th-century Pakistani male singers
21st-century Pakistani male singers